Bozhko is a surname. Notable people with the surname include:

Sergei Bozhko (born 1973), Russian footballer
Vladimir Bozhko (born 1949), Kazakhstani governmental minister